The 1932 SANFL Grand Final was an Australian rules football competition. Sturt beat North Adelaide 110 to 69.

References 

SANFL Grand Finals
SANFL Grand Final, 1932